The École nationale des sciences appliquées de Kénitra is a Moroccan engineering school founded in 2008 by a partnership between the University Ibn Tofail in Kenitra and the Institut national des sciences appliquées de Lyon. 

It is a Moroccan public institution, training engineers with specializations in;

Computer engineering
Telecommunication and Networks engineering
Electrical engineering
Industrial engineering
Mecatronic engineering
Civil engineering

External links
  Site officiel de l'ENSAK

Education in Morocco
Engineering universities and colleges